Padai Veetu Amman is a 2002 Indian Tamil-language devotional film directed by Pugazhmani. The film stars Meena, Ramki, Devayani and Ravali. It was released on 4 November 2002.

Plot

Meena plays the dual role of Goddess Padai Veettu Amman, and the neighbouring deity Muthu Maariamman, cutting a pretty picture in all her finery. Devayani plays Chamundi, a devotee, and the film opens with her being killed brutally on the eve of her marriage by the henchmen of the local bigwig. The latter's daughter was in love with the intended bridegroom Shankar and the fond father had wanted to remove the only hurdle in the way. The bigwig, in order to get his hands on a hidden treasure, had also taken the help of an evil tantrik. The presiding deity Muthu Maariamman is helpless, bound as she was by a vow she had made to Chamundi. That she wouldn't step out of her abode till Chamundi herself asked her to. It is time for the neighbouring deity Padai Veetu Amman to come to the rescue of the distressed village.

Cast

Meena as Goddess Padai Veetu Amman (Renuga Devi) and Goddess Muthu Mariamman
Ramki as Forest officer Shankar
Devayani as Chamundi 
Ravali as Rathna
Senthil as Sadaiyaandi
Vinu Chakravarthy as Kaathavaraayan
Nizhalgal Ravi as Rathna's father
P. R. Varalakshmi as Shankar's Mother 
K. R. Vatsala as Bhavani, Rathna's Mother
Baby Akshaya as Meenakshi 
Vellai Subbaiah as Priest
Bayilvan Ranganathan as Malaiyandi
Suryakanth

Soundtrack
Lyrics were written by Kalidasan, Kamakodiyan, Kirithaya and Rama Narayanan.

Reception 
Malini Mannath wrote for Chennai Online, "Fit for consumption, only for the suburban or rural audience!". S. R. Ashok Kumar wrote for The Hindu, "Good digital effects certainly make one sit through the entire film and Padai Veettu Amman has succeeded in it partially".

References

External links 

2000s Tamil-language films
2002 films
Films scored by S. A. Rajkumar
Hindu devotional films